Hold 'Em Jail is a 1932 American pre-Code comedy film starring Wheeler and Woolsey. They play a couple of boobs who are wrongfully convicted for firearm possession and sent to prison, where they somehow end up playing on the warden's football team.

Warden Edgar Kennedy is not above framing innocent people into prison and blackmailing them into playing on his football team in exchange for being eventually proven innocent.

Wheeler and Woolsey are wise to the racket, but Kennedy has to treat them with kid gloves because his old maid sister (Oliver) is in love with one of them.

Rare for the duo, the film is a straight comedy with no musical numbers. It is also noteworthy for giving Betty Grable her first substantial role after appearances as a Goldwyn Girl and in bit parts. The title is a pun on the then-popular college football cheer, "Hold 'em, Yale."

Cast
 Bert Wheeler as Curly Harris
 Robert Woolsey as Spider Robbins
 Edna May Oliver as Violet Jones
 Robert Armstrong as Radio Announcer
 Roscoe Ates as Sam
 Edgar Kennedy as Warden Elmer Jones
 Betty Grable as Barbara Jones
 Warren Hymer as Steele
 Paul Hurst as Butch
 G. Pat Collins as Whitey
 Stanley Blystone as Kravette
 Jed Prouty as Warden Charles Clark
 Spencer Charters as the Governor
 John Sheehan as Mike Maloney

Box office
According to RKO records the film recorded a loss of $55,000.

References

External links
 
 

1932 films
1930s sports comedy films
1930s prison films
American black-and-white films
American sports comedy films
American football films
American prison comedy films
1930s English-language films
Films directed by Norman Taurog
RKO Pictures films
1932 comedy films
1930s American films